Keenan Lynch is a Canadian cinematographer. He is most noted for his work on the 2022 film Tehranto, for which he received a Canadian Screen Award nomination for Best Cinematography at the 11th Canadian Screen Awards in 2023.

References

External links

Canadian cinematographers
Black Canadian artists
Living people
Year of birth missing (living people)
Place of birth missing (living people)